Canto General, an oratorio for two voices, mixed choir and orchestra by Mikis Theodorakis based on poems from Canto General by Pablo Neruda was recorded live on August 13, 1975, at the Karaiskakis-Stadium, Pireus and on August 16, 1975, at the Panathinaikos-Stadium, Athens.

The recording was performed by the artists that participated in the 1974 Paris première of the seven movements, that constituted the oratorio at that time. By 1981, Theodorakis had completed the oratorio to its now valid form in 13 movements. There are two recordings available of the complete opus (1981 conducted by Theodorakis as well, and 1989 conducted by Loukas Karytinos).

Track listing

A side
"Introduction by Manos Katrakis" - 2:12
"Algunas Bestias" - 11:02
"Voy A Vivir (1949)" - 5:50
"Los Libertadores" - 16:50

B side
"La United Fruit Co." - 7:20
"Vienen Los Pajaros" - 10:15
"Vegetaciones" - 7:05
"America Insurrecta (1800)" - 10:35

Personnel
 Maria Farantouri, vocal
 Petros Pandis, vocal
 The National Choir of France with director Jacques Grimbert
 Les Percussions de Strasbourg
 Alberto Newman, piano
 Dora Bakopoulos, piano
 Evangelos & Liza, guitars
 The Folk Orchestra with director Yiannis Didilis
 L. Karnezis, bouzouki
 Chr. Konstantinis, bouzouki

1975 live albums
Mikis Theodorakis albums
Cultural depictions of Pablo Neruda